Vekić (English: Vekich) is a South Slavic surname which is mainly associated with Croats and Serbs. The name is commonly found in present-day Croatia, Serbia and Bosnia and Herzegovina. 

Notable people with this surname: 

Donna Vekić (born 1996), Croatian tennis player
Ivan Vekić (born 1938), Croatian politician and lawyer
Ivan Vekić_(handball player) (born 1998), Croatian handball player
Mario Vekić (born 1982), Croatian rower
Matko Vekić (born 1970), Croatian painter
Žarko Vekić (born 1967), Serbian sprint canoeist

Croatian surnames
Serbian surnames
Patronymic surnames